The FBA 17 was a training flying boat produced in France in the 1920s.

Design and development
Similar in general layout to the aircraft that FBA had produced during World War I, the Type 17 was a conventional two-bay biplane with unequal-span, unstaggered wings and side-by-side open cockpits. The pusher engine was mounted on struts in the interplane gap. Apart from their use by the French Navy, a small number were sold to the Polish Navy, the Brazilian Air Force, and civil operators as well. Some versions were built as amphibians, and others had fittings to allow them to be catapulted from warships.

In 1931, the US Coast Guard purchased an example for evaluation, and being pleased with the design, arranged for the type to be built under licence by the Viking Flying Boat Company in New Haven, Connecticut. Six aircraft were eventually produced and served with the Coast Guard under the designation OO until the outbreak of World War II.

Variants
17 HE.2(Hydravion d'École) 2-seat trainer, Hispano-Suiza 8A-powered, (over 300 built).
17 HL.1(Hydravion de Liaison) 1-seat catapulatable liaison aircraft, Hispano-Suiza 8A-powered, (1 built)
17 HL.22-seat catapultable liaison aircraft, Hispano-Suiza 8A-powered, (10 built)
17 HMT.2(Hydravion Mixte de Transport) 2-seat amphibious transport aircraft, Hispano-Suiza 8A-powered, (37 built)
A FBA-17HMT2 plane called Lubliniak, was bought by the Airborne and Antigas Defence League (LOPP) with was funds donated by the readers of Głos Lubelski, for use in propaganda flights across central and eastern Poland.
17 HMB.217 HMT 2s already in service with the French Navy, were redesignated HMB 2, after being fitted with a bomb rack on the port side of the hull.
17 HMT.44-seat amphibious transport aircraft, Hispano-Suiza 8A-powered, (2 built)
17 HT.4(Hydravion de Transport'') 4-seat transport aircraft, Hispano-Suiza 8A-powered, (35 built)
171 HE.22-seat trainer, Lorraine Mizar-powered, (1 built).
172 HE.22-seat trainer, Gnome et Rhône 5B-powered, (5 built).
172 HMT.22-seat amphibious transport aircraft, Gnome et Rhône 5B-powered,  (1 built).
172 HT.44-seat transport aircraft, Gnome et Rhône 5B-powered,  (1 built).
172/2The HT.4 was redesignated Type 172/2, Gnome et Rhône 5B-powered, after it was fitted with extra fuel tanks.
Viking V-2French-built HT.4s converted to 2-seaters (4 converted)
Viking OO-1longer-span, Wright R-760-powered version of V-2 produced for USCG (5 built)

Operators

Brazilian Air Force
Brazilian Naval Aviation

French Navy

Polish Navy

United States Coast Guard
China

Specifications (17 HE.2)

See also

References

Further reading

External links
 
 
 
 
 
 
 
 
 
 
 
  

1920s French military trainer aircraft
Flying boats
FBA aircraft
Single-engined pusher aircraft
Biplanes
Aircraft first flown in 1923